Chris Flannery (born 5 June 1980) is an Australian former professional rugby league footballer who played in the 2000s and 2010s.

A Queensland State of Origin representative forward, he played his club football in the National Rugby League for the Sydney Roosters, with whom he won the 2002 NRL Premiership, and in the Super League for St. Helens, with whom he won the 2008 Challenge Cup.

After retiring Flannery administered the Sunshine Coast Falcons of the Queensland Cup.

Background
Born in Cowra, New South Wales, Flannery's family moved to the Sunshine Coast, Queensland when he was 10, where he played his junior rugby league for the Kawana Dolphins.

Playing career

National Rugby League
Flannery made his National Rugby League début for the Sydney Roosters in Round 14 of the 2000 NRL season against the Wests Tigers at Campbelltown Stadium on 7 May. He was first selected to play for Queensland in Game II of the 2002 State of Origin series at ANZ Stadium in Brisbane on 5 June. Queensland won 26–18.

Flannery played for the Roosters from the interchange bench in their 2002 NRL grand final victory over the New Zealand Warriors, scoring a try. Having won the 2002 NRL Premiership, the Roosters traveled to England to play the 2003 World Club Challenge against Super League champions, St. Helens. Flannery played at centre in Sydney's victory. He again played from the interchange bench for the Roosters in the 2003 NRL grand final which was lost to the Penrith Panthers.

Flannery played for Queensland in all three matches of the 2004 State of Origin series. He played for the Roosters at lock forward in their 2004 NRL grand final loss to cross-Sydney rivals, Canterbury-Bankstown.

Super League
In 2007, Flannery signed for St. Helens on a three and a half-year deal. Flannery was brought in as a direct replacement for fellow Australian Jason Hooper who had to retire following problems with his shoulder. Flannery described himself as a hard worker and strong in defence. "I also like to add a bit to the ball playing by taking it up at first or second receiver. I also like to run good lines into holes." He commenced his Knowsley Road career in July, 2007, after recovering from a broken leg. He played in the 2008 Super League Grand Final defeat by the Leeds Rhinos.

He played in the 2009 Super League Grand Final defeat by the Leeds Rhinos at Old Trafford.

Post-playing
After returning to Australia, Flannery became chief executive of Queensland Cup team the Sunshine Coast Falcons.

Footnotes

External links

Saints Heritage Society profile

1980 births
Living people
Australian rugby league administrators
Australian rugby league players
Prime Minister's XIII players
Queensland Rugby League State of Origin players
Rugby league centres
Rugby league locks
Rugby league players from Cowra, New South Wales
Rugby league second-rows
St Helens R.F.C. players
Sydney Roosters players